HBL Microfinance Bank Ltd, Pakistan (HBL MfB) is the largest microfinance bank of Pakistan, headquartered in the country’s capital, Islamabad. HBL MfB operates over 200 locations all over Pakistan. It is one of the oldest microfinance bank in the country with its roots in the credit and saving section of the Agha Khan Rural Support Program (AKRSP). The Bank offers a suite of conventional and digital banking products for its customers.

History 
HBL Microfinance Bank (HBL MfB), formerly The First MicroFinanceBank Ltd, Pakistan (FMFB-P), was established in 2002 as a nation-wide microfinance bank, licensed by the State Bank of Pakistan. HBL MfB was created through a structured transformation of the credit and savings section of the Aga Khan Rural Support Programme (AKRSP), an integrated development programme to pioneer the microfinance sector in the country since 1982 in Gilgit-Baltistan and Chitral. HBL MfB was established with the mission to respond to poverty and contributes to the social and economic well-being of society by providing opportunities to thousands of under-privileged households. Through targeted financial and multi-sectoral products and services based on the evolving needs of the unbanked and disenfranchised segments of the society, HBL MfB enables its clients to strengthen their entrepreneurial base and build financial, physical, and human capital to secure their future. Currently, HBL has a majority share-holding of 76.42% in HBL MfB.

Major Shareholding 
HBL has a majority stake in the bank.

References

Pakistani subsidiaries of foreign companies
Aga Khan Development Network
Microfinance companies of Asia
Banks established in 2002
Microfinance banks in Pakistan
Companies based in Islamabad